Group A of the 2003 FIFA Women's World Cup was one of four groups of nations, consisting of Nigeria, North Korea, Sweden and the United States. It began on September 20 and ended on September 28. Defending champions and host United States topped the group with a 100% record, joined in the second round by Sweden, who overcame their defeat in the first game to qualify for the knockout stage.

Standings

Matches
All times local (EDT/UTC–4)

Nigeria vs North Korea

United States vs Sweden

Sweden vs North Korea

United States vs Nigeria

Sweden vs Nigeria

North Korea vs United States

References

External links
2003 FIFA Women's World Cup Group A

Group
Group
Group
2003 in North Korean football
2003–04 in Nigerian football